A geological phenomenon is a phenomenon which is explained by or sheds light on the science of geology.

Examples of geological phenomena are:

 Mineralogic phenomena
 Lithologic phenomena
 Rock types
 Igneous rock
 Igneous formation processes
 Sedimentary rock
 Sedimentary formation processes (sedimentation)
 Quicksand
 Metamorphic rock
 Endogenic phenomena
 Plate tectonics
 Continental drift
 Earthquake
 Oceanic trench
 Phenomena associated with igneous activity
 Geysers and hot springs
 Bradyseism
 Volcanic eruption
 Earth's magnetic field
 Exogenic phenomena
 Slope phenomena
 Slump
 Landslide
 Weathering phenomena
 Erosion
 Glacial and peri-glacial phenomena
 Glaciation
 Moraines
 Hanging valleys
 Atmospheric phenomena
 Impact phenomena
 Impact crater
 Coupled endogenic-exogenic phenomena
 Orogeny
 Drainage development
 Stream capture

Phenomena